The Berkeley Hotel is a Grade II listed public house and hotel in Scunthorpe. It was built in 1940 and is listed on the Campaign for Real Ale's National Inventory of Historic Pub Interiors. It was Grade II listed in 2015 by Historic England.

References

National Inventory Pubs
Hotels in Lincolnshire
Grade II listed buildings in North Lincolnshire
Buildings and structures in Scunthorpe
Grade II listed pubs in Lincolnshire